The Mental Cutting Test is a measure of spatial visualization ability (MCT) (CEEB,1939) first developed for a university entrance examination in the USA. 

The test consists of 25 items. For each problem on the exam, students are shown a criterion figure which is to be cut with an assumed plane. They must choose the correct resulting cross-section from among five alternatives. (MCT) (CEEB, 1939)

References 
Sorby A. Sheryl "Developing 3-D Spatial Visualization Skills", Michigan Technological University, Engineering Design Graphics Journal, Volume 63 Number 2]

External links
 The Mental Cutting Test “Schnitte” and the Picture Rotation Test—Two New Measures to Assess Spatial Ability Quaiser-Pohl, Claudia (2003)

Cognitive tests